The 2021–22 season was the Bangladesh Police Football Club's 50th season since its establishment in 1972 and their 3rd season in the top flight, Bangladesh Premier League. In addition to domestic league, Bangladesh Police FC will participate on this season's edition of Federation Cup and Independence Cup. This season cover period was 1 October 2021 to 1 August 2022.

Season preview

October
On 17 October 2021 Police FC has appointed Romanian  Aristică Cioabă as a head coach for next domestic football season.
 
On 31 August 2021 forward  Jamir Uddin left the club to Saif Sporting Club on free transfer contract.
 
On 22 October 2021 midfielder Nazmul Islam Rasel ended his contract and he has signed with Saif Sporting Club for upcoming football season.

November
On 30 November Bangladesh Police FC have meet first match of the season and they have finished the match with 1–1 goals drew against Chittagong Abahani. In the second half Portuguese midfielder Denílson goal lead them but Chittagong Abahani Peter Ebimobowei equalized the score.

December
On 4 December Bangladesh Police FC lost by 0–1 goal to Bashundhara Kings. Winning penalty goal on 16 minutes by 
Robinho
secured the club victory.

On 8 December Bangladesh Police FC draw 1–1 goals with Bangladesh Navy. In the 6 minutes of second half MS Bablu gave them lead but 72 minutes Police FC Afghan forward Amredin Sharifi own goal level the scored  and match ended with 1–1 goals.

On 12 December Bangladesh Police FC defeated 1–0 goal Sheikh Russel KC. Winning goal by Amredin Sharifi on 4 minutes and ensured their victory. As a result of this match they have qualified to Semi-finals.

On 14 December Bangladesh Police FC lost by 1–2 goals versus Bashundhara Kings. On 8 minutes Danilo Quipapá goal took lead Police FC. In the 30 minutes Kings Mohammed Ibrahim equalized 1–1 and finished half time. In the second half both team played goalless end of second half extended 30 minutes Yeasin Arafat goal on 119 minutes ensured Kings victory.

On 26 December Bangladesh Police FC 1–1 draw versus Saif Sporting Club. On 55 minutes Saif defender Emery Bayisenge penalty goal took lead Saif SC but in the additional time 90+2 minutes goals by Amredin Sharefi draw the match and both teams share point.

On 28 December Bangladesh Police FC lost 0–2 goals against Chittagong Abahani. In the first half 24 minutes scored by Arifur Rahman Chittagong Abahai hold lead and end first half. In the second half 60 minutes William Twala goal Chittagong Abahani made 2–0 and they ensure 3 points.

February
On 4 February Bangladesh Police FC has meet season first away match against Saif Sporting Club and lost by 0–1 goal. Both team in the first half has played goalless. In the second half regulations times ended 0–0 but in the additional time on 90+2 minutes Saif SC Rwandian defender Emery Bayisenge goal gave them 3 points and left the field with victory. Bangladesh Police FC started Premier League journey will lost match.

On 8 February Bangladesh Police FC drawn 1–1 goals home match against Dhaka Abahani. In the first half time both teams played excellent and competitive football and until half time score 0–0 goal. In the second half on 76 minutes a goal by Danilo Quipapá Bangladesh Police FC got lead 1–0 until addition time scored by  Dhaka Abahani on (90+3) minutes Dorielton match finished with a 1–1 goals drawn.

On 12 February Bangladesh Police FC has meet against Sheikh Jamal DC in the away match and finished it goalless 0–0. In the first half both team play excellent and ended it goalless. In the second half both teams started playing attacking football to take lead but they won't found any goals. On 81 minutes Uzbekistan Otabek Valizhazov showed red card due to bad fouls. Last 19 minutes Sheikh Jamal DC played with 10 men's squad but Police FC couldn't able to score any goal.

On 17 February Bangladesh Police FC lost 0–3 goals against Bashundhara Kings  in the away game. In the first halftime both teams played excellent football but no teams has score any goals. In the second half on 66 minutes a goal by Robinho Bashudhara Kings took lead. On 77 minutes penalty goal by Robinho lead the score 2–0. On 82 minutes Police FC Md Eshanur Rahman showed red card and sent off him. On 87 minutes a goal by Eleta Kingsley made scoreline 3–0 and Bashundhara Kings got full three points.

On 24 February Bangladesh Police FC defeated 2–0 goals Uttar Baridhara SC in the away match. In the first half both team played competitive football and they have ended first half goalless. In the second half on 73 minutes Md Faisal Ahmed Shitol goal took lead Bangladesh Police FC made score 1–0 and on 88 minutes Amredin Sharifi extended it 2–0 for Police FC and they have finished the game with three points.

March
On 2 March Bangladesh Police FC won by 1–0 against Muktijoddha Sangsad KC at home ground.

On 7 March Bangladesh Police FC defeated Swadhinata KS by 4–2 goals at home venue.

On 12 March Bangladesh Police FC defeated Rahmatganj MFS by 2–1 goals in the away game.

On 18 March Bangladesh Police FC drew 1–1 goals versus Sheikh Russel KC at home ground.

April
On 4 April Bangladesh Police FC drew versus Dhaka Mohammedan with score 0–0 in the away game.

On 8 April Bangladesh Police FC lost against Chittagong Abahani by 1–2 goals at home ground.

On 25 April Bangladesh Police FC have lost by 1–6 goals at home venue against Saif Sporting Club.

May
On 7 May Bangladesh Police FC defeated Sheikh Jamal DC by 1–0 goal at home game.

On 12 May Bangladesh Police FC have lost versus Bashundhara Kings by 1–2 goals at home match.

June
On 22 June Bangladesh Police FC got victory by 3–2 goals against Uttar Baridhara Club at home ground.

On 29 June Bangladesh Police FC have beat Muktijoddha Sangsad KC by 4–1 goals in the away game.

July
On 4 July Bangladesh Police FC have won by 1–0 goal versus Swadhinata KS in the away match.

Current squad
Bangladesh Police FC squad for 2021–22 season.

Pre-season friendly

Transfer

Out

In

Released

Competitions

Overall

Overview

Independence Cup

Group stages

Group D

Knockout stage

Federation Cup

Group stages

Group C

Premier League

League table

Results summary

Results by round

Matches

Statistics

Goalscorers

Source: Matches

References

2021 in Bangladeshi football
2022 in Bangladeshi football
Bangladeshi football club records and statistics
Football clubs in Bangladesh